Sandrine Daudet (21 June 1972 – 18 November 2019) was a French short track speed skater. She competed at the 1992 Winter Olympics and the 1994 Winter Olympics.

References

External links
 

1972 births
2019 deaths
People from Fontenay-sous-Bois
Sportspeople from Val-de-Marne
French female short track speed skaters
Olympic short track speed skaters of France
Short track speed skaters at the 1992 Winter Olympics
Short track speed skaters at the 1994 Winter Olympics
20th-century French women